Squalius anatolicus is a species of ray-finned fish in the family Cyprinidae.
It is found only in Turkey.
Its natural habitat is freshwater lakes.

References

Squalius
Endemic fauna of Turkey
Fish described in 1997
Taxonomy articles created by Polbot